The Surrey Championships  also known as the Surrey Grass Court Championships  and the Surrey County Championships is a defunct tennis tournament played in Surbiton, Surrey, England on outdoor grass courts. It ran for 73 editions from 1890 to 1981 and after a period of 18 years re-emerged as the Surbiton Trophy.

History
The Surrey Championships was first staged in 1890 and was an amateur tournament until the open era of tennis considered an important warm-up event to the Wimbledon championships and the first big opener of the grass court season  it attracted many former British and foreign Grand Slam champions post open era the tournament was part of the men's Grand Prix Tour in 1974 and from 1979 to 1980. During the 1975 Championships the tournament witnessed the longest single game in tennis history, during a match between Keith Glass and Anthony Fawcett – the game was not timed but it contained 37 deuces. The men's championships moved to a northern venue in 1981. In 1997 the tournament was first revived as an exhibition tournament won by Jason Stoltenberg. Then in 1998 the former Surrey Championships was restored with a new name known as the Surbiton Trophy.

Champions
Notes: Challenge round: The final round of a tournament, in which the winner of a single-elimination phase faces the previous year's champion, who plays only that one match. The challenge round was used in the early history of tennis (from 1877 through 1921) in some tournaments, but not all. (c) Indicates challenger

Men's singles

Men's doubles

Women's singles

Note: The 1898 to 1900 events (*) were "closed" tournaments that were restricted to county team members only.

Notes

References

External links
https://app.thetennisbase.com/Surrey Championships Roll of Honour
http://www.tennisarchives.com/Surrey Championships Roll of Honour

Grand Prix tennis circuit
Grass court tennis tournaments
Tennis tournaments in England
ATP Tour
1890 establishments in England
Recurring sporting events established in 1890
1981 disestablishments in England
Sport in the Royal Borough of Kingston upon Thames
Recurring events disestablished in 1980
Defunct tennis tournaments in the United Kingdom